The Object Is... is a game show which aired on ABC from December 30, 1963 to March 27, 1964. The series was the first game for host Dick Clark. Mike Lawrence was the announcer.

Gameplay
Three celebrities and three contestants competed in a game in which they tried to identify people (celebrities, historical figures, or fictional characters) from objects typically associated with that person. Each contestant played with two celebrities - one who gave a clue and one who received it.

For example, if the person were "Charles Lindbergh", a clue from the first celebrity might be "transatlantic airplane"; if the contestant guessed correctly, it would be worth ten points; if not, the contestant gave a clue to the second celebrity for seven points. Clues were worth ten points, then seven, then five, then three. If the subject was not guessed after the three-point clue, the subject was thrown out.

The first contestant to score fifteen points won US$75 and the right to team with a celebrity in the "Winner's Game", in which they attempted to identify as many celebrities associated with a particular object as possible in thirty seconds, earning US$5 for each correct answer. The Winner's Game was later eliminated, and the winner of each game simply won US$100 up front.

Each of the other players earned US$5 per point, with all players competing for the entire episode, and the winner of the most cash returning to play again.

Changes
For the last two or three weeks of the run, the format changed to two celebrity-contestant teams (similar to Password) who tried to identify the person in a maximum of three clues for up to 10 points; they now played a two-out-of-three match, with each game worth US$100.

Broadcast history
Object debuted on the second-to-last day of 1963 at 11:30 AM (10:30 Central), replacing the Jack Narz game Seven Keys in a scheduling shuffle. Object faced the same competition its predecessor did – the Ed McMahon-hosted Missing Links on NBC and local programming on CBS. While Links had a nearly four-month jump on Object, local programming managed to cause both games to bow in defeat on March 27, 1964.

The following Monday, however, showed there was a clear winner – Missing Links, which moved to ABC with Clark as host (McMahon was still under contract to NBC). Nine months later, Links fell to the Peacock's replacement series – Jeopardy!

Episode status
Compared to most other game shows of the era, Object is completely intact – all 65 episodes, plus the pilot (taped November 26, 1963), are held by the UCLA Film & Television Archive.

Three episodes circulate among collectors – the premiere, the finale, and the second-to-last episode; notably, in the latter, Stubby Kaye promotes the debut of Shenanigans.

References

External links
 

American Broadcasting Company original programming
1960s American game shows
1963 American television series debuts
1964 American television series endings